Cuntan Station is a station on Line 4 of Chongqing Rail Transit in Chongqing municipality, China. It is located in Jiangbei District and opened in 2018.

References

Railway stations in Chongqing
Railway stations in China opened in 2018
Chongqing Rail Transit stations